George Nicolescu (born 12 March 1950) is a blind Romanian musician.

Born in Ploieşti, Nicolescu has four sisters. He attended the Bucharest School for Amblyopia Patients (1957-1959), middle school and high school (1960-1968) and the School for the Blind in Cluj (1968–1972). Self-taught, he made his singing debut in Cluj and in 1970 won first prize at the Tinereţe pe portativ ("Youth on the Scale") festival. A few years later, the composer George Grigoriu began to influence him, and the two began collaborating. In 1973, his first hit, "Eternitate" ("Eternity"), was released, and the following year came four hits released on a 45, under Grigoriu's name.

In 1972 he gained admission to the University of Bucharest's Faculty of Romance Languages, French-Romanian section. He graduated in 1976 and the following April began teaching French at the School for the Blind in Buzău, where he remained until 1985. That year, he was hired as a vocal soloist at the Buzău Youth House. After the Romanian Revolution of 1989, he was engaged for several months (March–November 1990) as a soloist with the ensemble "Optimiştii", a troupe of blind performers.

He retired in 1992, taking part in various shows and singing in restaurants in order to earn a living. In autumn 2002, ten years after retiring, Nicolescu returned to the top of the Romanian charts through a duet with the band UNU'. The hit single was called "Cântec pentru sănătatea ierbii" ("Song for the Grass's Health"). He also performed "Îndrăgostit" ("In Love") with the young singer Jorge. In December 2007, he released the album Muzică uşoară...lăutărească ("Light Music, Lăutar-style"), featuring songs by other musicians of his age such as Dan Spătaru, Mirabela Dauer, Gabriel Dorobanţu and Corina Chiriac.

Discography

 Şi cântau mandolinele (1974)
 Ordinea de zi (1984)
 Prefă-te inimă în stea (1989)
 Muzică uşoara...lăutărească (2007)
 Unu feat. George Nicolescu - Mai avem nevoie si de iarba  ( 2007 ) 
 Shift feat. George Nicolescu - Viata-i de vina (2012)

References

External links
 Profile  at music2.ro
 Biography  at music2.ro

1950 births
Living people
Blind musicians
Romanian blind people
Romanian male singers
People from Ploiești
University of Bucharest alumni